Sheila Mary Weight  (née Weeks; 10 January 1922 – 15 July 2011) was a New Zealand local-body politician. She was the first woman to service as president of the Auckland Institute and Museum Trust Board.

Biography
Weight was born Sheila Mary Weeks in London, England, on 10 January 1922, and served in the Women's Auxiliary Air Force during World War II. She emigrated to New Zealand in 1946, and subsequently married Peter Everard Weight. The couple went on to have six children.

Later in life, Sheila Weight served as a councillor on the One Tree Hill Borough Council and represented the borough on the Trust Board of the Auckland Institute and Museum. From 1982, she also served as vice-president of the institute, becoming the president in 1986. She was the first woman to be elected to either position. She was appointed to be a justice of the peace in 1985.

In the 1999 New Year Honours, Weight was appointed a Member of the New Zealand Order of Merit, for services to the community.

Weight died on 15 July 2011. Her husband, Peter, died in 2013.

References

1922 births
2011 deaths
British women in World War II
Women's Auxiliary Air Force airwomen
British emigrants to New Zealand
Members of the New Zealand Order of Merit
People from Auckland
Local politicians in New Zealand
New Zealand justices of the peace
People associated with the Auckland War Memorial Museum